Ladislao Cabrera is a province in the southern parts of the Bolivian department of Oruro.  It is named after Ladislao Cabrera (1830 – 1921). Its seat is Salinas de Garci Mendoza.

Location
Ladislao Cabrera is one of sixteen provinces in the Oruro Department. It is located between 19° 02' and 19° 56' South and between 66° 35' and 67° 43' West.

The province borders Sud Carangas Province in the north, Atahuallpa Province in the west, Potosí Department in the south, Eduardo Avaroa Province in the east, and Sebastián Pagador Province in the northeast.

The province extends over 100 km from north to south, and 125 km from east to west.

Population
The main language of the province is Aymara, spoken by 90.5%, while 86.4% of the population speak Spanish and 19.7% Quechua.

The population increased from 7,363 inhabitants (1992 census) to 11,698 (2001 census), an increase of 59%. - 42.5% of the population are younger than 15 years old.

99.9% of the population have no access to electricity, 90.0% have no sanitary facilities.

82.4% of the population are employed in agriculture, 0.1% in mining, 1.8% in industry, 15.7% in general services (2001).

85.4% of the population are Catholics, 10.2% are Protestants (1992).

Division
The province comprises two municipalities which are further subdivided into cantons.

See also 
 Ch'iyar Qullu
 Jayu Quta
 Jilarata
 Sallani Yapu
 Tunupa

External links
Population data (Spanish)

Provinces of Oruro Department